Gérard Noël (24 June 1900 – 11 June 1963) was a Belgian athlete. He competed in the men's pole vault and the men's decathlon at the 1928 Summer Olympics.

References

1900 births
1963 deaths
Athletes (track and field) at the 1928 Summer Olympics
Belgian male pole vaulters
Belgian decathletes
Olympic athletes of Belgium
Place of birth missing